William Herman Cuddeback (March 23, 1852 – August 16, 1919)  was an American lawyer and politician from New York, with his career culminating in his election to the New York Court of Appeals in 1912.

Biography
He was born on March 23, 1852, in Deerpark, New York to Lewis Cuddeback (1807–1889) and Caroline Lee Thompson (1820–1877). He was educated at Goshen Academy and graduated from Cornell University in 1874.  He was admitted to the bar in 1877, and practiced in Goshen until 1885, when he moved to Buffalo, New York. He was Chairman of the Democratic Committee of Buffalo from 1895 to 1896, and Corporation Counsel of Buffalo from 1898 to 1902.

In 1912, he was elected on the Democratic and Independence League tickets to the New York Court of Appeals, defeating Progressive George Kirchwey. During his tenure he concurred on landmark cases written by his colleague Benjamin Cardozo, including MacPherson v. Buick Motor Co. and Wood v. Lucy, Lady Duff-Gordon.

He died on August 16, 1919, in Goshen, New York.

He was succeeded by Abram I. Elkus whom Governor Alfred E. Smith appointed to complete his term.

He was buried in Slate Hill Cemetery in Goshen, New York.

References

Sources
Roots Web Entry
Court of Appeals judges at The Historical Society of the Courts of New York State
Bio at Court History
Death notice, in NYT on August 18, 1919

External links
Willam H. Cuddeback Portrait, Historical Society of the Courts of New York State

Judges of the New York Court of Appeals
1852 births
1919 deaths
Cornell University alumni
People from Orange County, New York
Politicians from Buffalo, New York
New York (state) Democrats
United States Independence Party politicians
Lawyers from Buffalo, New York
19th-century American judges
19th-century American lawyers